Vincent de Rivaz (born 4 October 1953, in Paris) is the former chief executive (CEO) of EDF Energy plc, a British subsidiary of Électricité de France.

Early life
He studied engineering at the École Nationale Supérieure d'Hydraulique et de Mécanique de Grenoble, part of the Grenoble Institute of Technology in the Rhône-Alpes region.

Career

Électricité de France
He joined Électricité de France in 1977 as a hydraulic engineer. From 1991-94 he was the managing director of the hydropower department.

He became head of the UK operations in 2002.

EDF Energy
He was CEO of EDF Energy between 2003 - 2017.

He met Bill Coley, the former chief executive of British Energy, in 2005 to discuss a take-over of British Energy.

In November 2017 he stepped down as CEO and was replaced with Simone Rossi.

Personal life
He married Anne de Valence de Minardière in 1980. They have three sons. He was awarded Knight of the Legion of Honour, the Melchett Medal in 2006, and an honorary Commander of the British Empire (CBE) in 2012.

References

External links
 EDF Energy

1953 births
Living people
Grenoble Institute of Technology alumni
Businesspeople from Paris
Chevaliers of the Légion d'honneur
Électricité de France people
Engineers from Paris
French chief executives
French mechanical engineers
Hydraulic engineers
French expatriates in England